Tornoceras is a strongly involute, subdiscoidal Middle and Upper Devonian goniatite with a suture that forms six to ten lobes.

Aulatornoceras,  Protornoceras,  Epitornoceras, Lobotornoceras are among related genera included in the Tornoceratidae. Inclusion however varies from classification to classification.

References

Tornoceratidae
Goniatitida genera
Devonian animals of Europe
Devonian animals
Late Devonian animals
Devonian animals of Africa
Middle Devonian first appearances
Late Devonian genus extinctions